The Spring Symphony is a choral symphony by Benjamin Britten, his Opus 44. It is dedicated to Serge Koussevitzky and the Boston Symphony Orchestra. It was premiered in the Concertgebouw, Amsterdam, on Thursday 14 July 1949 (not 9 July which is quoted by many sources) as part of the Holland Festival, when the composer was 35. At the premiere the tenor soloist was Peter Pears, the soprano Jo Vincent and the contralto Kathleen Ferrier. The conductor was Eduard van Beinum. A recording of the performance survives and was first issued by Decca in August 1994.

In October 1950, the Spring Symphony was performed at the Leeds Triennial Musical Festival with a choir of 100 boys.

The Spring Symphony is written for soprano, alto and tenor soloists, mixed chorus, boys' choir (often performed by a children's choir instead) and orchestra. Britten sets several poets' words, chiefly from the 16th and 17th century such as Edmund Spenser, John Clare and George Peele. A notable exception is 'Out on the lawn I lie in bed' by his friend W. H. Auden.

In the composer's own words, the work represents 'the progress of Winter to Spring and the reawakening of the earth and life which that means'.

Structure 
The Spring Symphony is made up of four parts, which correspond to the movements of a conventional symphony: Allegro with slow introduction, slow movement, scherzo, and finale. Part I begins with the dark and mysterious Shine Out, a poem to the sun. Several more songs follow, including The Driving Boy, which is a piece that features the boys' choir, at times whistling, and tambourine. The second part has several solos and quiet choruses and references to the month of May. The third part looks forward to May and then to summer. The Finale, London, to Thee I do Present, comes to a climax when the entire chorus joins in a wordless, full-throated waltz representing the May revellers fortified by wine and ale (borne out by some rather unexpected modulations). The climax of the movement is the moment when the children's voices, accompanied by unison French horns, re-enter the scene and sing the 13th century round Sumer is icumen in. The simple tune, sung in  time over the unyielding  waltz of the rest of the ensemble, finally achieves dominance. Eventually the celebrations subside, and the Maylord then offers a final blessing with the proclamation: "And so, my friends, I cease."

The large orchestra includes triple woodwinds, two harps, and a large percussion section. Each song has its distinctive scoring, ranging from just first and second violins accompanying the tenor (Waters Above!) to full orchestra in the first and last songs. The last movement adds the call of a cow-horn, specifying a G, C, and F.

Songs in the Spring Symphony 
The songs (and authors) in the Spring Symphony are as follows:

Part 1
 Introduction: Shine Out (Anonymous) (mixed chorus)
 The Merry Cuckoo (Edmund Spenser) (tenor solo)
 Spring, the Sweet Spring (Thomas Nashe) (soprano, alto and tenor soli, mixed chorus)
 The Driving Boy (George Peele, John Clare) (soprano solo and boys' choir)
 The Morning Star (John Milton) (mixed chorus)

Part 2
 Welcome, Maids of Honour (Robert Herrick) (alto solo)
 Waters Above! (Henry Vaughan) (tenor solo)
 Out on the lawn I Lie in bed (W. H. Auden) (alto solo and mixed chorus)

Part 3
 When will my May Come? (Richard Barnfield) (tenor solo)
 Fair and Fair (George Peele) (soprano and tenor soli)
 Sound the Flute! (William Blake) (male chorus, female chorus and boys' choir)

Part 4
  Finale: London, to Thee I do Present (Anon, closing words from The Knight of the Burning Pestle by Francis Beaumont) (soprano, alto and tenor soli, mixed chorus and boys' choir)

See also
List of symphonies by name

References

Compositions by Benjamin Britten
Britten Spring
Spring Symphony
1949 compositions